John Tuthill Bagot (15 February 1819 – 13 August 1870) was a South Australian politician.

Bagot was the second son of Charles Bagot, of Kilcoursie House, King's County, Ireland, by Anna, eldest daughter of John Tuthill, of Kingsland, co. Limerick.  Though described as Charles Hervey Bagot's nephew their actual relationship was more distant.  J. T. Bagot was admitted to the Irish bar. He married in 1848 Eliza, daughter of John Meyler.

Bagot emigrated to South Australia, and was elected to the semi-elective South Australian Legislative Council of 1855–6, for the district of Light. From 1857 to 1864 he represented Light in the South Australian House of Assembly. On 26 September 1866, he was elected to the new Legislative Council, and continued to hold the seat until 16 June 1870, when he resigned.

He was South Australia's only colonial Solicitor-General, serving in the Baker Ministry from 21 August to 1 September 1857. He also served as Commissioner of Crown Lands and Immigration in the First Reynolds Ministry from 9 May 1860, to 20 May 1861; Attorney-General in John Hart's Ministry from 24 September to 13 October 1868; and Chief Secretary in Mr. Strangways' Government from 3 November 1868, to 12 May 1870.

References 

|-

|-

|-

|-

1819 births
1870 deaths
Members of the South Australian House of Assembly
Members of the South Australian Legislative Council
Irish emigrants to colonial Australia
19th-century Irish lawyers
Attorneys-General of South Australia
Solicitors-General of South Australia
19th-century Australian politicians
19th-century Australian public servants